The Ryder Cup is a biennial men's golf competition between teams from Europe and the United States. Originally contested between Great Britain and the United States, the first official Ryder Cup took place in 1927. The representation of "Great Britain and Ireland" was extended to include continental Europe from 1979.

In all the following tables Europe includes Great Britain/Great Britain and Ireland up to 1977.

For details of individual players' complete Ryder Cup records see: List of European Ryder Cup golfers and List of American Ryder Cup golfers.

Summary 
There have been a total of 1012 individual matches played in the 43 Ryder Cups. Of these the United States has won 492, Europe (including Great Britain/Great Britain and Ireland up to 1977) has won 382 with 138 matches halved. Thus the United States have scored a total of 561 points to Europe's 451.

36 holes matches were played up to 1959, 18 hole matches from 1961 onwards. Fourball matches were first played in 1963. The table includes three 18 hole single matches (in 1979, 1991 and 1993) which were not actually played because of injury but were declared as halved matches.

Holes-in-one 
The following players have scored a hole-in-one.

Europe

United States

Largest margins of victory in a match

36 hole matches (to 1959) 
All victories by 7 or more holes for Europe and by 8 or more holes for the United States are listed.

Europe 

The largest victory in a foursomes match was a 7&5 win by Aubrey Boomer & Charles Whitcombe against Leo Diegel & Bill Mehlhorn in 1927.

United States

18 hole matches (from 1961) 
All victories by 5 or more holes for Europe and by 6 or more holes for the United States are listed.

Europe 

The largest victory in a singles match has been a 5&4 win, achieved 9 times, firstly by Bernard Hunt against Jerry Barber in 1961.

United States 

The largest victory in a fourball match has been a 7&5 win by Lee Trevino & Jerry Pate against Nick Faldo & Sam Torrance in 1981.

Pairings

Most frequent pairings 
Pairings used 7 or more times for Europe and 5 or more times for the United States are listed.

Europe

United States

Age-related records 
The ages given are on the first day of the Ryder Cup. Generally the leading 5 in each category are given.

Youngest players

Europe

United States

Oldest players

Europe 

The oldest rookie was Ted Ray in 1927.

United States 

The oldest rookie was Fred Funk in 2004.

Longest lived players

Europe 

Peter Mills, currently aged , is the oldest living British/European Ryder Cup player.

United States 

Jack Burke Jr. is the only survivor of the 1951,  1953 and 1955 American teams.

†  denotes age at death, or, if living, age as of

Captains 
Youngest Ryder Cup captain: Arnold Palmer –  in 1963
Youngest European captain: Charles Whitcombe –  in 1931
Youngest non-playing captain: Ben Hogan –  in 1949
Youngest non-playing European captain: Tony Jacklin –  in 1983
Oldest Ryder Cup captain: Tom Watson –  in 2014
Oldest European captain: J.H. Taylor –  in 1933
Oldest playing captain: Ted Ray –  in 1927
Oldest playing United States captain: Sam Snead –  in 1959

References

Records